Olaudah Equiano (c. 1745 – 31 March 1797), known for most of his life as Gustavus Vassa, was a writer and abolitionist from, according to his memoir, the Eboe (Igbo) region of the Kingdom of Benin (today southern Nigeria).  Enslaved as a child in Africa, he was shipped to the Caribbean as a victim of the Atlantic slave trade and sold as a slave to a Royal Navy officer. He was sold twice more but purchased his freedom in 1766.

As a freedman in London, Equiano supported the British abolitionist movement. Equiano was part of the Sons of Africa, an abolitionist group comprised of Africans living in Britain, and he was active among leaders of the anti-slave trade movement in the 1780s. Equiano published his autobiography, The Interesting Narrative of the Life of Olaudah Equiano (1789), which depicted the horrors of slavery. The autobiography went through nine editions in his lifetime and helped obtain passage of the British Slave Trade Act 1807, which abolished the slave trade. Equiano married an English woman, Susannah Cullen, in 1792 and they had two daughters. He died in 1797 in Westminster.

Since the late 20th century, when his autobiography was published in a new edition, he has been studied by various scholars, including from his homeland.

Early life and enslavement 
According to his memoir, Equiano was born in Essaka, Eboe, in the Kingdom of Benin around 1745. The village was in the southeast part of present-day Nigeria. In his autobiography he wrote: "My father, besides many slaves, had a numerous family, of which seven lived to grow up" and that he was the youngest son. He stated that his father was one of the elders or chiefs who sat in judgement with other elders to decide what to do about disputes or crimes. He refers to men called the Oye-Eboe who brought goods like guns, gunpowder and dried fish. In return, Equiano says: "Sometimes indeed we sold slaves to them, but they were only prisoners of war, or such among us as had been convicted of kidnapping, or adultery, and some other crimes, which we esteemed heinous." He proceeded, "When a trader wants slaves, he applies to a chief for them, and tempts him with his wares ... and accepts the price of his fellow creature's liberty with as little reluctance as the enlightened merchant." This was usually the cause of war in order to obtain the slaves to gratify "his avarice".

Equiano recounted an incident of an attempted kidnapping of children in his Igbo village, which was foiled by adults. When he was around the age of eleven, he and his sister were left alone to look after their family premises, as was common when adults went out of the house to work. They were both kidnapped and taken far from their hometown, separated and sold to slave traders. He tried to escape but was thwarted. After his owners changed several times, Equiano happened to meet with his sister but they were separated again. Six or seven months after he had been kidnapped, he arrived at the coast where he was taken on board a European slave ship. He was transported with 244 other enslaved Africans across the Atlantic Ocean to Barbados in the British West Indies. He and a few other slaves were sent on for sale in the Colony of Virginia.

Literary scholar Vincent Carretta argued in his 2005 biography of Equiano that the activist could have been born in colonial South Carolina rather than Africa, based on a 1759 parish baptismal record that lists Equiano's place of birth as Carolina and a 1773 ship's muster that indicates South Carolina. Carretta's conclusion is disputed by other scholars who believe the weight of evidence supports Equiano's account of coming from Africa.

In Virginia, Equiano was bought by Michael Henry Pascal, a lieutenant in the Royal Navy. Pascal renamed the boy "Gustavus Vassa", after the 16th-century King of Sweden Gustav Vasa who began the Protestant Reformation in Sweden. Equiano had already been renamed twice: he was called Michael while on board the slave ship that brought him to the Americas; and Jacob, by his first owner. This time, Equiano refused and told his new owner that he would prefer to be called Jacob. His refusal, he says, "gained me many a cuff" and eventually he submitted to the new name. He used this name for the rest of his life, including on all official records; he only used Equiano in his autobiography.

Pascal took Equiano with him when he returned to England and had him accompany him as a valet during the Seven Years' War with France (1756–1763). Equiano gives eyewitness reports of the Siege of Louisbourg (1758), the Battle of Lagos (1759) and the Capture of Belle Île (1761). Also trained in seamanship, Equiano was expected to assist the ship's crew in times of battle; his duty was to haul gunpowder to the gun decks. Pascal favoured Equiano and sent him to his sister-in-law in Great Britain so that he could attend school and learn to read and write.

Equiano converted to Christianity and was baptised at St Margaret's, Westminster, on 9 February 1759, when he was described in the parish register as "a Black, born in Carolina, 12 years old". His godparents were Mary Guerin and her brother, Maynard, who were cousins of his master Pascal. They had taken an interest in him and helped him to learn English. Later, when Equiano's origins were questioned after his book was published, the Guerins testified to his lack of English when he first came to London.

In December 1762, Pascal sold Equiano to Captain James Doran of the Charming Sally at Gravesend, from where he was transported back to the Caribbean, to Montserrat, in the Leeward Islands. There, he was sold to Robert King, an American Quaker merchant from Philadelphia who traded in the Caribbean.

Release 

Robert King set Equiano to work on his shipping routes and in his stores. In 1765, when Equiano was about 20 years old, King promised that for his purchase price of 40 pounds he could buy his freedom. King taught him to read and write more fluently, guided him along the path of religion, and allowed Equiano to engage in profitable trading for his own account, as well as on his owner's behalf. Equiano sold fruits, glass tumblers and other items between Georgia and the Caribbean islands. King allowed Equiano to buy his freedom, which he achieved in 1766. The merchant urged Equiano to stay on as a business partner. However, Equiano found it dangerous and limiting to remain in the British colonies as a freedman. While loading a ship in Georgia, he was almost kidnapped back into enslavement.

Freedom 
By about 1768, Equiano had gone to Britain. He continued to work at sea, travelling sometimes as a deckhand based in England. In 1773 on the Royal Navy ship HMS Racehorse, he travelled to the Arctic in an expedition towards the North Pole. On that voyage he worked with Dr Charles Irving, who had developed a process to distill seawater and later made a fortune from it. Two years later, Irving recruited Equiano for a project on the Mosquito Coast in Central America, where he was to use his African background to help select slaves and manage them as labourers on sugar-cane plantations. Irving and Equiano had a working relationship and friendship for more than a decade, but the plantation venture failed. Equiano met with George, the "Musquito king’s son".

Equiano left the Mosquito Coast in 1776 and arrived at Plymouth, England, on 7 January 1777.

Pioneer of the abolitionist cause 
Equiano settled in London, where in the 1780s he became involved in the abolitionist movement. The movement to end the slave trade had been particularly strong among Quakers, but the Society for Effecting the Abolition of the Slave Trade was founded in 1787 as a non-denominational group, with Anglican members, in an attempt to influence parliament directly. Under the Test Act, only those prepared to receive the sacrament of the Lord's Supper according to the rites of the Church of England were permitted to serve as MPs. Equiano had been influenced by George Whitefield's evangelism.

As early as 1783, Equiano informed abolitionists such as Granville Sharp about the slave trade; that year he was the first to tell Sharp about the Zong massacre, which was being tried in London as litigation for insurance claims. It became a cause célèbre for the abolitionist movement and contributed to its growth.

On 21 October 1785 he was one of eight delegates from Africans in America to present an 'Address of Thanks' to the Quakers at a meeting in Gracechurch Street, London. The address referred to A Caution to Great Britain and her Colonies by Anthony Benezet, founder of the Society for the Relief of Free Negroes Unlawfully Held in Bondage.

Equiano was befriended and supported by abolitionists, many of whom encouraged him to write and publish his life story. He was supported financially in this effort by philanthropic abolitionists and religious benefactors. His lectures and preparation for the book were promoted by, among others, Selina Hastings, Countess of Huntingdon.

Memoir 

Entitled The Interesting Narrative of the Life of Olaudah Equiano, or Gustavus Vassa, the African (1789), the book went through nine editions in his lifetime. It is one of the earliest-known examples of published writing by an African writer to be widely read in England. By 1792, it was a best seller and had been published in Russia, Germany, Holland and the United States. It was the first influential slave narrative of what became a large literary genre. But Equiano's experience in slavery was quite different from that of most slaves; he did not participate in field work, he served his owners personally and went to sea, was taught to read and write, and worked in trading.

Equiano's personal account of slavery, his journey of advancement, and his experiences as a black immigrant caused a sensation on publication. The book fuelled a growing anti-slavery movement in Great Britain, Europe and the New World. His account surprised many with the quality of its imagery, description and literary style.

In his account, Equiano gives details about his hometown and the laws and customs of the Eboe people. After being captured as a boy, he described communities he passed through as a captive on his way to the coast. His biography details his voyage on a slave ship and the brutality of slavery in the colonies of the West Indies, Virginia and Georgia.

Equiano commented on the reduced rights that freed people of colour had in these same places, and they also faced risks of kidnapping and enslavement. Equiano embraced Christianity at the age of 14 and its importance to him is a recurring theme in his autobiography. He was baptised into the Church of England in 1759; he described himself in his autobiography as a "protestant of the church of England" but also flirted with Methodism.

Several events in Equiano's life led him to question his faith. He was distressed in 1774 by the kidnapping of his friend, a black cook named John Annis, who was taken forcibly off the British ship Anglicania on which they were both serving. His friend's kidnapper, William Kirkpatrick, did not abide by the decision in the Somersett Case (1772), that slaves could not be taken from England without their permission, as common law did not support the institution in England & Wales. Kirkpatrick had Annis transported to Saint Kitts, where he was punished severely and worked as a plantation labourer until he died. With the aid of Granville Sharp, Equiano tried to get Annis released before he was shipped from England but was unsuccessful. He heard that Annis was not free from suffering until he died in slavery. Despite his questioning, he affirms his faith in Christianity, as seen in the penultimate sentence of his work that quotes the prophet Micah: "After all, what makes any event important, unless by its observation we become better and wiser, and learn 'to do justly, to love mercy, and to walk humbly before God?'"

In his account, Equiano also told of his settling in London. He married an English woman and lived with her in Soham, Cambridgeshire, where they had two daughters. He became a leading abolitionist in the 1780s, lecturing in numerous cities against the slave trade. Equiano records his and Granville Sharp's central roles in the anti-slave trade movement, and their effort to publicise the Zong massacre, which became known in 1783.

Reviewers have found that his book demonstrated the full and complex humanity of Africans as much as the inhumanity of slavery. The book was considered an exemplary work of English literature by a new African author. Equiano did so well in sales that he achieved independence from his benefactors. He travelled throughout England, Scotland and Ireland promoting the book. He worked to improve economic, social and educational conditions in Africa. Specifically, he became involved in working in Sierra Leone, a colony founded in 1792 for freed slaves by Britain in West Africa.

Later years, radical connections 
During the American Revolutionary War, Britain had recruited black people to fight with it by offering freedom to those who left rebel masters. In practice, it also freed women and children, and attracted thousands of slaves to its lines in New York City, which it occupied, and in the South, where its troops occupied Charleston, South Carolina. When British troops were evacuated at the end of the war, their officers also evacuated these former American slaves. They were resettled in the Caribbean, in Nova Scotia, in Sierra Leone in Africa, and in London. Britain refused to return the slaves, which the United States sought in peace negotiations.

In 1783, following the United States' gaining independence, Equiano became involved in helping the Black Poor of London, who were mostly those former African-American slaves freed during and after the American Revolution by the British. There were also some freed slaves from the Caribbean, and some who had been brought by their owners to England and freed later after the decision that Britain had no basis in common law for slavery. The black community numbered about 20,000. After the Revolution some 3,000 former slaves had been transported from New York to Nova Scotia, where they became known as Black Loyalists, among other Loyalists also resettled there. Many of the freedmen found it difficult to make new lives in London or Canada.

Equiano was appointed "Commissary of Provisions and Stores for the Black Poor going to Sierra Leone" in November 1786. This was an expedition to resettle London's Black Poor in Freetown, a new British colony founded on the west coast of Africa, in present-day Sierra Leone. The blacks from London were joined by more than 1,200 Black Loyalists who chose to leave Nova Scotia. They were aided by John Clarkson, younger brother of abolitionist Thomas Clarkson. Jamaican maroons, as well as slaves liberated from illegal slave-trading ships after Britain abolished the slave trade, also settled at Freetown in the early decades. Equiano was dismissed from the new settlement after protesting against financial mismanagement and he returned to London.

Equiano was a prominent figure in London and often served as a spokesman for the black community. He was one of the leading members of the Sons of Africa, a small abolitionist group composed of free Africans in London. They were closely allied with the Society for the Abolition of the Slave Trade. Equiano's comments on issues were published in newspapers such as the Public Advertiser and the Morning Chronicle. He replied to James Tobin in 1788, in the Public Advertiser, attacking two of his pamphlets and a related book from 1786 by Gordon Turnbull. Equiano had more of a public voice than most Africans or Black Loyalists and he seized various opportunities to use it.

Equiano was an active member of the radical working-class London Corresponding Society, which campaigned for democratic reform.  In 1791–92, touring the British Isles with his autobiography and drawing on abolitionist networks he brokered connections for the LCS, including what may have been the Society's first contacts with the United Irishmen. In Belfast, where his appearance in May 1791 was celebrated by abolitionists who five years previously had defeated  plans to commission vessels in the port for the Middle Passage, Equiano was hosted by the leading United Irishman, publisher of their Painite newspaper the Northern Star, Samuel Neilson. Following the onset of war with revolutionary France, leading members of the LCS, including Thomas Hardy with whom Equiano lodged in 1792, were charged with treason, and in 1799, following evidence of communication between leading members and the insurrectionary United Irishmen, the society was suppressed.

Marriage and family 

On 7 April 1792, Equiano married Susannah Cullen, a local woman, in St Andrew's Church, Soham, Cambridgeshire. The original marriage register containing the entry for Vassa and Cullen is held today by the Cambridgeshire Archives and Local Studies. He included his marriage in every edition of his autobiography from 1792 onwards. The couple settled in the area and had two daughters, Anna Maria (1793–1797) and Joanna (1795–1857) who were baptised at Soham church.

Susannah died in February 1796, aged 34, and Equiano died a year after that on 31 March 1797. Soon after, the elder daughter died at the age of four, leaving the younger child, Joanna Vassa, to inherit Equiano's estate when she was 21; it was then valued at £950. Anna Maria is commemorated by a plaque at St Andrew's Church, Chesterton, Cambridge. Joanna Vassa married the Reverend Henry Bromley, a Congregationalist minister, in 1821. They are both buried at the non-denominational Abney Park Cemetery in Stoke Newington, London; the Bromleys' monument is now a Grade II listed building.

Last days and will 
He drew up his will on 28 May 1796. At the time he made this will he was living at the Plaisterers' Hall, then on Addle Street, in Aldermanbury in the City of London. He moved to John Street (now Whitfield Street), close to Whitefield's Tabernacle, Tottenham Court Road. At his death on 31 March 1797, he was living in Paddington Street, Westminster. Equiano's death was reported in American as well as British newspapers.

Equiano was buried at Whitefield's Tabernacle on 6 April. The entry in the register reads "Gustus Vasa, 52 years, St Mary Le bone". His burial place has been lost. The small burial ground lay either side of the chapel and is now Whitfield Gardens. The site of the chapel is now the American International Church.

Equiano's will, in the event of his daughters' deaths before reaching the age of 21, bequeathed half his wealth to the Sierra Leone Company for a school in Sierra Leone, and half to the London Missionary Society.

Controversy related to memoir 
Following publication in 1967 of a newly edited version of his memoir by Paul Edwards, interest in Equiano revived. Scholars from Nigeria have also begun studying him.  For example, S.S. Ogede identifies Equiano as a pioneer in asserting "the dignity of African life in the white society of his time".

In researching his life, some scholars since the late 20th century have disputed Equiano's account of his origins. In 1999 while editing a new version of Equiano's memoir, Vincent Carretta, a professor of English at the University of Maryland, found two records that led him to question the former slave's account of being born in Africa. He first published his findings in the journal Slavery and Abolition. At a 2003 conference in England, Carretta defended himself against Nigerian academics, like Obiwu, who accused him of "pseudo-detective work" and indulging "in vast publicity gamesmanship". In his 2005 biography, Carretta suggested that Equiano may have been born in South Carolina rather than Africa, as he was twice recorded from there. Carretta wrote:

Equiano was certainly African by descent. The circumstantial evidence that Equiano was also African-American by birth and African-British by choice is compelling but not absolutely conclusive. Although the circumstantial evidence is not equivalent to proof, anyone dealing with Equiano's life and art must consider it.

According to Carretta, Equiano/Vassa's baptismal record and a naval muster roll document him as from South Carolina. Carretta interpreted these anomalies as possible evidence that Equiano had made up the account of his African origins, and adopted material from others. But Paul Lovejoy, Alexander X. Byrd and Douglas Chambers note how many general and specific details Carretta can document from sources that related to the slave trade in the 1750s as described by Equiano, including the voyages from Africa to Virginia, sale to Pascal in 1754, and others. They conclude he was more likely telling what he understood as fact, rather than creating a fictional account; his work is shaped as an autobiography.

Lovejoy wrote that:

circumstantial evidence indicates that he was born where he said he was, and that, in fact, The Interesting Narrative is reasonably accurate in its details, although, of course, subject to the same criticisms of selectivity and self-interested distortion that characterize the genre of autobiography.

Lovejoy uses the name of Vassa in his article, since that was what the man used throughout his life, in "his baptism, his naval records, marriage certificate and will". He emphasises that Vassa only used his African name in his autobiography.

Other historians also argue that the fact that many parts of Equiano's account can be proven lends weight to accepting his account of African birth. As historian Adam Hochschild has written:

In the long and fascinating history of autobiographies that distort or exaggerate the truth. ... Seldom is one crucial portion of a memoir totally fabricated and the remainder scrupulously accurate; among autobiographers ... both dissemblers and truth-tellers tend to be consistent.

He also noted that "since the 'rediscovery' of Vassa's account in the 1960s, scholars have valued it as the most extensive account of an eighteenth-century slave's life and the difficult passage from slavery to freedom".

Legacy 
 The Equiano Society was formed in London in November 1996. Its main objective is to publicise and celebrate the life and work of Olaudah Equiano.
 In 1789 Equiano moved to 10 Union Street (now 73 Riding House Street). A City of Westminster commemorative green plaque was unveiled there on 11 October 2000 as part of Black History Month. Student musicians from Trinity College of Music played a fanfare composed by Professor Ian Hall for the unveiling.
 Equiano is honoured in the Church of England and remembered in its Calendar of saints with a Lesser Festival on 30 July, along with Thomas Clarkson and William Wilberforce who worked for abolition of the slave trade and slavery.
 In 2007, the year of the celebration in Britain of the bicentenary of the abolition of the slave trade, Equiano's life and achievements were included in the National Curriculum, together with William Wilberforce. In December 2012 The Daily Mail claimed that both would be dropped from the curriculum, a claim which itself became subject to controversy. In January 2013 Operation Black Vote launched a petition to request Education Secretary Michael Gove to keep both Equiano and Mary Seacole in the National Curriculum. American Rev. Jesse Jackson and others wrote a letter to The Times protesting against the mooted removal of both figures from the National Curriculum.
 A statue of Equiano, made by pupils of Edmund Waller School, was erected in Telegraph Hill Lower Park, New Cross, London, in 2008.
 The head of Equiano is included in Martin Bond's 1997 sculpture Wall of the Ancestors in Deptford, London
 Author Ann Cameron adapted Equiano's autobiography for children, leaving most of the text in Equiano's own words; the book was published in 1995 in the U.S. by Random House as The Kidnapped Prince: The Life of Olaudah Equiano, with an introduction by historian Henry Louis Gates Jr.
 On 16 October 2017, Google Doodle honoured Equiano by celebrating the 272nd year since his birth.
 A crater on Mercury was named "Equiano" in 1976.
 In 2019, Google Cloud named a subsea cable running from Portugal through the West Coast of Africa and terminating in South Africa after Equiano.
 In 2022, the city of Cambridge honoured Equiano by renaming Riverside Bridge to Equiano Bridge.

Representation in other media 
 The Gambian actor Louis Mahoney played Equiano in the BBC television mini-series The Fight Against Slavery (1975).
 A 28-minute documentary, Son of Africa: The Slave Narrative of Olaudah Equiano (1996), produced by the BBC and directed by Alrick Riley, uses dramatic reconstruction, archival material and interviews to provide the social and economic context for his life and the slave trade.

Numerous works about Equiano have been produced for and since the 2007 bicentenary of Britain's abolition of the slave trade:
 Equiano was portrayed by the Senegalese musician Youssou N'Dour in the film Amazing Grace (2006).
 African Snow (2007), a play by Murray Watts, takes place in the mind of John Newton, a captain in the slave trade who later became an Anglican cleric and hymnwriter. It was first produced at the York Theatre Royal as a co-production with Riding Lights Theatre Company, transferring to the Trafalgar Studios in London's West End and a national tour. Newton was played by Roger Alborough and Equiano by Israel Oyelumade.
 Kent historian Dr Robert Hume wrote a children's book entitled Equiano: The Slave with the Loud Voice (2007), illustrated by Cheryl Ives.
 David and Jessica Oyelowo appeared as Olaudah and his wife in Grace Unshackled – The Olaudah Equiano Story (2007), a BBC 7 radio adaptation of Equiano's autobiography.
 The British jazz artist Soweto Kinch's first album, Conversations with the Unseen (2003), contains a track entitled "Equiano's Tears".
 Equiano was portrayed by Jeffery Kissoon in Margaret Busby's 2007 play An African Cargo, staged at London's Greenwich Theatre.
 Equiano is portrayed by Danny Sapani in the BBC series Garrow's Law (2010).
 The Nigerian writer Chika Unigwe has written a fictional memoir of Equiano: The Black Messiah, originally published in Dutch: De zwarte messias (2013).
 In Jason Young's 2007 short animated film, The Interesting Narrative of Olaudah Equiano, Chris Rochester portrayed Equiano.
 A TikTok series under the account @equiano.stories recounts “the true story of Olaudah Equiano”, a collection of episodes reimagining the childhood of Equiano. The story is captured as a self-recorded, first-person account, within the format of Instagram Stories/TikTok posts, using video, still images, and text.
 In 2022 a documentary entitled The Amazing Life of Olaudah Equiano was broadcast by BBC Radio 4.

See also 
 Nigerian aristocracy, the class that Equiano belonged to at birth
 Black British elite, the class that Equiano joined after gaining his freedom
 Ottobah Cugoano, an African abolitionist active in Britain in the late 18th century
 Phillis Wheatley, recognised in the 18th century as the first African-American poet; first African-American woman to publish a book
 List of civil rights leaders
 List of slaves

References

Further reading 
 The Interesting Narrative of the Life of Olaudah Equiano, or Gustavus Vassa, the African at Wikisource.
 For the history of the Narrative's publication, see James Green, "The Publishing History of Olaudah Equiano's Interesting Narrative", Slavery and Abolition 16, no. 3 (1995): 362–375.
 S. E. Ogude, "Facts into fiction: Equiano's narrative reconsidered", Research into African Literatures, Vol. 13, No. 1, 1982
 S. E. Ogude, "Olaudah Equiano and the tradition of Defoe", African Literature Today, Vol. 14, 1984
 James Walvin, An African's Life: The Life and Times of Olaudah Equiano, 1745–1797 (London: Continuum, 1998)
 Luke Walker, Olaudah Equiano: The Interesting Man (Wrath and Grace Publishing, 2017)

External links 

 
 
 
 
 Frederick Quinn, "Olaudah Equiano", Dictionary of African Christian Biography, article reproduced with permission from African Saints: Saints, Martyrs, and Holy People from the Continent of Africa, copyright © 2002 by Frederick Quinn, New York: Crossroads Publishing Company
 Olaudah Equiano, or Gustavus Vassa, the African, Brycchan Carey website, Carey 2003–2005. Includes Carey's comprehensive collection of resources for the study of Equiano. The Nativity section  includes a detailed comparison of differing data related to his place of birth.
 The Equiano Project , The Equiano Society and Birmingham Museum & Art Gallery
 Part I: "Olaudah Equiano", Africans in America, PBS
 "Historic figures: Olaudah Equiano", BBC

1740s births
1797 deaths
18th-century Igbo people
18th-century Nigerian people
18th-century slaves
Anglican saints
Black British activists
Black British former slaves
Black British history
Black British politicians
Black British writers
British abolitionists
British autobiographers
British evangelicals
Christian abolitionists
Converts to Anglicanism
Converts to Protestantism from pagan religions
Nigerian expatriates in the United Kingdom
Nigerian slaves
People who wrote slave narratives
Writers of captivity narratives